Typhlacontias brevipes, also known as the FitzSimon's  burrowing skink or short blind dart skink, is a skink species endemic to the Namib Desert (Namibia). It was described by Vivian FitzSimons in 1938.

Etymology
The species name is derived from the Latin words brevis, -e = short and pes, pedis = foot.

Description 
These slender skinks have small eyes with no eyelids and no external ear openings. The hindlimb rudiments are visible on either side of cloaca. The body coloration varies from light buff to sulphur yellow. Vague stripes, formed by the scales, can occur along the back and upper flanks. The tail is blue-grey.

Females are viviparous and give birth to up to three young.

Ecology 
Typhlacontias brevipes typically occur on the leeward side of dunes in the roots of grass tufts found in semi-stable sand. They are active at night and in the cooler hours of the day when they forage for small insects like ants, termites, antlions, and beetles.

References

External links 
Photographs available at:
 Observations in the Genus: Typhlacontias
 Specimen from Swakopmund

Typhlacontias
Skinks of Africa
Reptiles of Namibia
Endemic fauna of Namibia
Reptiles described in 1938
Taxa named by Vivian Frederick Maynard FitzSimons